Mads Hedenstad Christiansen (born 21 October 2000) is a Norwegian football goalkeeper who plays for Lillestrøm.

He started his youth career in Fet IL, switching to Lillestrøm SK in 2014. After the odd bench appearance for the senior team in 2017 and 2018, he was benched for 16 games in 2019 and made his debut in 2020. Becoming their mostly used goalkeeper, he began the 2021 season on the bench but started his first Eliteserien match in May against Odd.

Honours
Individual
Eliteserien Breakthrough of the Year: 2021

References

2000 births
Living people
People from Fet
Norwegian footballers
Lillestrøm SK players
Norwegian First Division players
Eliteserien players
Association football goalkeepers
Norway youth international footballers
Sportspeople from Viken (county)